The Chevrolet Indy V8 engine is a 3.0-liter and 3.5-liter, naturally-aspirated, V-8 racing engine developed and produced by Chevrolet, for use in the IRL IndyCar Series; from 2002 to 2005.

Specifications
Engine type: Chevrolet V-8
V angle (deg.): 90°   
Capacity: 
Horsepower rating:  or 
Torque rating: Approx.  @ 10,300 rpm
Max RPM: 10,300 rpm - 10,700 rpm
Weight: 
Oil system: Dry-sump lubrication
Aspiration: Naturally-aspirated
Camshafts: Gear-driven Double-overhead camshafts
Cylinder head: 4 valves (titanium) per cylinder
Fuel injection/system: Sequential EFI with two injectors/cylinder 
Fuel: Methanol
Block & head material: Aluminum
Crankshaft bore (mm/in.): 93/3.66
Crankshaft stroke (mm/in.): 55.1/2.17
Crankshaft type (deg.): 180°
Crankshaft: Billet steel
Con rods: Billet steel
Pistons: Billet aluminum
Throttle system: Individual runner throttle bodies
Mileage: 2.5 mpg
Gearbox: Sequential manual gearbox

Applications
Dallara IR-00 
Dallara IR-03
G-Force GF05

References

External links
Chevrolet on IndyCar.com website
Chevrolet Motorsport's Official Website
Chevrolet IndyCar official website on chevrolet.com

Engines by model
Chevrolet engines
IndyCar Series
V8 engines